Abcott is a hamlet in south Shropshire, England.

It lies on the west side of the River Clun and its flood plain, just opposite from the village of Clungunford, which is the parish the hamlet is part of.  The B4367 road crosses the Clun (at Clungunford Bridge) and passes the hamlet, on its way between Clungunford and Bucknell.  A lane connects the B4367 at Abcott and Twitchen.

The famous Rocke Cottage tea rooms is situated on the B road at Abcott (formerly the Bird on the Rock tea rooms, and historically the Rocke Arms public house).  Abcott Manor is a Grade II* ("two star") Listed building.

Abcott was a medieval township, despite its proximity to the parish's main village and parish church (St Cuthbert's) just on the other side of the Clun.

The 740 bus service calls at Abcott, outside the tea rooms, with three buses a day to Ludlow and Knighton. Nearby is Hopton Heath, which has a railway station on the Heart of Wales Line, which passes by the hamlet.

See also
 Listed buildings in Clungunford

References

External links
 

Hamlets in Shropshire